The National Science and Technology Council (NSTC) is a statutory agency of Executive Yuan of the Republic of China (Taiwan) for the promotion and funding of  academic research, development of science and technology and science parks. NSTC is a member of Belmont Forum.

History
The NSTC was originally established as the National Council on Science Development on  1 February 1959. In 1967, it was renamed to National Science Council (NSC). The NSC became the Ministry of Science and Technology on 3 February 2014. Pursuant to the  Act for Adjustment of Functions and Organizations of the Executive Yuan, as proposed by the Executive Yuan in March 2021, and approved by the Legislative Yuan in December 2021, the Ministry of Science and Technology was reorganized as a ministry-level council named National Science and Technology Council starting 26 July 2022.

Organizational structure

Departments
 Department of Planning
 Department of Natural Sciences and Sustainable Development
 Department of Engineering and Technologies
 Department of Life Sciences
 Department of Humanities and Social Sciences
 Department of International Cooperation and Science Educations
 Department of Foresight and Innovation Policies
 Department of Academia-Industry Collaboration and Science Park Affairs

Offices
 Department of General Affairs
 Department of Personnel
 Department of Budget, Accounting and Statistics
 Department of Government Ethics
 Department of Information Services
 Legal Affairs Committee (Petitions and Appeals Committee)
 Office of Congressional Relations

Bureau and Agencies
 Hsinchu Science Park Bureau
 Central Taiwan Science Park Bureau
 Southern Taiwan Science Park Bureau
 National Science and Technology Center for Disaster Reduction
 National Applied Research Laboratories
 National Synchrotron Radiation Research Center
 Taiwan Space Agency

List of Ministers
Political Party:

Budget
The 2014 budget for NSTC is NT$44.043 billion, in which 79.6% is dedicated for support for academic research, 12.5% for promotion of national science and technology development and 7.9% for development of science parks.

Transportation
The NSTC building is accessible within walking distance South West from Technology Building Station of the Taipei Metro.

See also
 Tsinghua Big Five Alliance
 Executive Yuan
 Taiwan Ocean Research Institute
 Economy of Taiwan#Science

References

External links

 Science & Technology Policy Research and Information Center (STPI)

1959 establishments in Taiwan
Executive Yuan
Funding bodies
Government ministries of the Republic of China
Taiwan